Cougar is an instrumental post-rock band from Madison, Wisconsin formed in 2003. Formerly on the Madison-based record label Layered Music (the label of Youngblood Brass Band, of which drummer D.H. Skogen is also a member). Cougar toured the United States, Europe and the UK on the release of their debut album Law during early 2007, including a well-received show in Madison.

Discography

Law
Law is Cougar's début album. It was recorded at Layered Studios in Madison and released by Layered Music in Europe in February 2006, and in America release was one year later, on February 20, 2007. It was distributed by Play It Again Sam.

 "Atlatl" – 5:36
 "One" – 0:49
 "Strict Scrutiny" – 5:06
 "Pulse Conditioner" – 4:01
 "Interracial Dating" – 3:30
 "Two" – 0:47
 "Your Excellency" – 5:34
 "Three" – 0:41
 "Lifetime Ranger" – 4:28
 "Four" – 0:38
 "The Mosaicist" – 5:20
 "Black Dove" – 5:43
 "Five" – 0:59
 "Merit" – 3:39
 "Postscript" – 0:47
All tracks written by Cougar.

Todd Hill – bass guitar
Trent Johnson – guitar
DH Skogen – percussion
Aaron Sleator – electronics, guitar
Dan Venne – guitar
John McEntire – additional recording and mixing
Satoshi Shinozaki – recording of strings on "Black Dove"
Christian Zamora – strings on "Black Dove"

Reviews
Pitchfork Media (6.7/10) link
Time Out Chicago  link
XLR8R (8/10) link

Patriot
Patriot is the second studio album by instrumental band Cougar, released in August 2009.

While reception was warm, reviewers tussled with the task of pigeonholing the sound of the album, roll-calling contemporary and influential bands and works. Rock Sound reviewer Dan Morgan illustrated the album's sound: "polyrhythmic Fugazi structures merge delicately with angelic post rock and the sort of even-handed electronica that 65daysofstatic might produce if their parents forced them onto Ritalin." Likewise, Alexander Tudor of Drowned in Sound questioned the categorisation of the band and their sound: "Does the grey area between (guitar-led, crescendo-prone) post-rock and instrumental electronica actually have a name we can agree on… or is this what Simon Reynolds had in mind when he coined post-rock, in the mid-Nineties?" Structurally, he compares the album to Mogwai's Mr. Beast, Björk and Meanwhile, back in Communist Russia.... Writing for the NME, Matt Warwick describes the track "Florida Logic" as "Mars Volta-inspired".

Band members
 David Henzie-Skogen – percussion; recording
 Todd Hill – bass guitar
 Trent Johnson – guitar
 Aaron Sleator – electronics, synths and guitar; recording
 Dan Venne – guitar; recording
 Nic Cowles – flute on "Absaroka"
 Sinead Nic Gearailt – harp on "Pelourinho"
 James Murray – vocals on "Rhinelander"
 Nat McIntosh – euphonium on "Absaroka"
 Daniel Miles – bass clarinet on "This is an Affidavit" and "Absaroka"
 Scott Pauli – photography and design
 Amelia Royko – vocals on "Rhinelander"
 Anna Suechting – French horn on "This is an Affidavit" and "Absaroka"
 Roger Siebel – mastering
 Beau Sorenson – mixing
 Peter Streicher – photography and design

Reviews
Drowned in Sound (7/10)
NME (8/10)
Rock Sound (8/10)

Resources 
MySpace
Official web site

See also 
 Cultural significance of the cougar in North America

References 

American post-rock groups
Rock music groups from Wisconsin